Darnall Place is a historic farm complex located at Poolesville, Montgomery County, Maryland, United States. The farm complex consists of four small 18th-century stone buildings, a 19th-century frame wagon shed/corn crib, a 20th-century concrete block barn, and three late-19th- or early-20th-century frame sheds. The stone buildings are all constructed of red-brown Seneca sandstone. The one-story dwelling has a large external stone chimney on the east end. The farmstead is reminiscent of those in Europe or the British Isles.

Darnall Place was listed on the National Register of Historic Places in 1979.

References

External links
, including photo in 1998, at Maryland Historical Trust website

Houses in Montgomery County, Maryland
Houses on the National Register of Historic Places in Maryland
Historic American Buildings Survey in Maryland
National Register of Historic Places in Montgomery County, Maryland